The Workmen's Compensation Act 1906 was an Act of the Parliament of the United Kingdom which deals with the right of working people for compensation for personal injury. The Act expanded the scheme created by the Workmen's Compensation Act 1897.

It fixes the compensation that a workman may recover from an employer in case of accident giving to a workman, except in certain cases of "serious and wilful misconduct", a right against his employer to a certain compensation on the mere occurrence of an accident where the common law gives the right only for negligence of the employer.

A 'workman' was defined as:
any person who enters into or works under a contract of service or apprenticeship with an employer, whether by way of manual labour, clerical work or otherwise, and whether the contract is expressed or implied, is oral or in writing.

Exceptions were made, including non-manual workers employed on annual pay over £250, casual workers employed "otherwise than for the purposes of their employer's trade or business", outworkers and family workers. Hence specific exclusions were made at both the top and bottom end of the labour market.

The National Insurance (Industrial Injuries) Act 1946 abolished the scheme (except for transitional cases) and replaced it with one of state liability.

See also
Workers' compensation
Workmen's Compensation Act 1897
Contracts of Employment Act 1963
UK labour law
English tort law

Notes

References

Simon Deakin, 'The historical process of wage formation', in Linda Clarke et al., The Dynamics of Wage Relations in the New Europe (2000) pp. 38–9

External links
 Text of the Act 

United Kingdom labour law
United Kingdom Acts of Parliament 1906
1906 in labor relations
Workers' compensation